Gorka Guruzeta Rodríguez (born 12 September 1996) is a Spanish professional footballer who plays as a striker for Athletic Bilbao.

Club career
Born in San Sebastián, Gipuzkoa, Basque Country, Guruzeta joined Athletic Bilbao's youth setup in 2014, from Antiguoko KE. He made his debut as a senior with the farm team in the 2014–15 campaign, in Tercera División.

On 18 December 2015, profiting from the injury of Asier Villalibre, Guruzeta was promoted to the reserves in Segunda División. He made his professional debut three days later, starting in a 1–1 home draw against CD Lugo.

Guruzeta made his first-team – and La Liga – debut on 27 August 2018, replacing Markel Susaeta late into a 2–2 home draw against SD Huesca; he went on to appear in eight more league and Copa del Rey matches during the campaign, with one goal in a cup fixture away to Sevilla FC (Athletic won on the night but lost the tie on aggregate). In April 2019, back playing for the B-team in the third tier, he suffered a serious injury, rupturing the anterior cruciate ligament of his right knee. He made a successful recovery but did not play again for the first team.

On 1 September 2020, Guruzeta terminated his contract with the Lions, and signed a three-year contract with second division newcomers CE Sabadell FC just hours later, with Athletic retaining an option until 2022 to buy him back. He scored his first professional goal on 22 November, netting his team's second in a 3–1 home success over UD Las Palmas.

On 16 July 2021, after suffering relegation, Guruzeta signed for SD Amorebieta. On 3 July of the following year, after scoring 13 goals as his side suffered relegation, he returned to Athletic on a two-year contract.

Personal life
Guruzeta's father, Xabier, was also a footballer; a central defender, he mainly represented Real Sociedad during his career. His younger brother Jon, who plays as a right winger, also began his career at Antiguoko before agreeing to join Athletic Bilbao's cantera in 2018.

Career statistics

References

External links
 
 
 
 
 
 

1996 births
Living people
Spanish footballers
Footballers from San Sebastián
Association football forwards
La Liga players
Segunda División players
Segunda División B players
Tercera División players
Antiguoko players
CD Basconia footballers
Bilbao Athletic footballers
Athletic Bilbao footballers
CE Sabadell FC footballers
SD Amorebieta footballers